Jean Landry may refer to:

Jean Landry (politician) (born 1948), politician from Quebec, Canada
Jean Landry (ice hockey), (born 1953), Canadian ice hockey defenceman
Jean Landry (physician) (1826–1865), French physician and medical researcher, responsible for discovering Guillain–Barré syndrome